National Astronomy Week (NAW) is an event held every few years in the United Kingdom to promote public awareness of astronomy by celebrating notable astronomical events. The last NAW, Mars Encounter, was run during the week of 14–22 November 2020.

Activities
During the week, astronomy societies, planetaria, schools, universities and other organisations from all over the UK organise events to promote interest in, and knowledge of, astronomy. The organisers promote the week using extensive contacts with the media and all the major UK astronomical organisations, many of whom provide funding. Events range from talks, visits and in particular the opportunity for children and adults alike to observe the sky through a range of equipment. Increasing use is being made of "virtual" events with talks and observations being streamed.

History
The need for National Astronomy Week (NAW) was first defined in the late 1970s.  A group of both professional and amateur astronomers as well as teachers and educators was formed to define and run the first ever event. NAW was proposed in 1979 and a steering committee was set up in 1980. Since then a total of eight events have run as listed below.

2020
The eighth event, named "Mars Encounter", ran from 14 to 22 November 2020. Mars made a very close approach to Earth, and will not be as close again until 2035. Saturn and Jupiter were in an excellent position as they approached the Great Conjunction which took place the following month.  Initially the week was planned to be a conventional series of viewing sessions and talks across the UK.  But the arrival of the coronavirus pandemic meant that conventional events could not be run, so instead the week was run "virtually" and involved streaming live events and observation sessions direct to homes. Most of the talks and observation sessions were run by the National Astronomy Week organising team, and these events were all recorded and can still be viewed. An index to the recordings can be found on the NAW website  or they can be viewed via the NAW YouTube Channel. 
The NAW Team Events can be seen by clicking NAW Events in the menu; talks and events run by other societies and science centres are under "Events". In the event the week was not a good one for observing, with cloud for much of the week. Fortunately, the use of streaming meant observations could take place from wherever had clear skies, for example Northumberland and Cyprus.

2014
The seventh event, named "Target Jupiter", ran from 1–8 March 2014. Jupiter was at a very high position in the sky, the best that will be achieved for many years. Observing conditions were generally well above average. More than 200 events were run across the UK. Participating organisations included astronomy societies, schools, universities, and Scouts/Guides. The details of the 2014 NAW are still available on the National Astronomy Week website. 
The event was widely announced in the UK, for example in Astronomy & Geophysics magazine, and there is also information on the NAW Twitter page and on Facebook. A special event radio station, call sign GB1NAW, transmitted  from Lockyer Technology Centre during National Astronomy Week (and the week preceding), between 7.060 MHz and 7.200 MHz LSB (Lower Side Band) during daylight hours and between 3.600 MHz and 3.800 MHz LSB after dusk.

Sponsorship and funding
National Astronomy Week is sponsored (and funded) by a number of UK astronomy societies and actively supported by the Royal Astronomical Society. Other funds are sometimes obtained from science organisations in the UK, including the Science & Technology Facilities Council.

See also
 Astronomy Day
 100 Hours of Astronomy (100HA)
 Earth Hour
 Earth Day
 National Dark-Sky Week (NDSW)
 White House Astronomy Night

References

External links
 
 Science & Technologies Facilities Council
 Royal Astronomical Society
 GB1NAW Web page

Astronomy education events
Astronomy in the United Kingdom